Stephen Stanley Bate  (born 24 August 1977) is a New Zealand–British Paralympic cyclist who competes in tandem races as an athlete with a visual impairment. Since 2014, Bate has been piloted by Adam Duggleby. At the 2016 Rio Olympics, the pair won gold in the men's individual pursuit B and men's road time trial B, and bronze in the men's road race B.

In 2018 Bate and Duggleby won the UCI World Para-cycling Tandem B Individual Pursuit and the UCI World Para-cycling Tandem B Individual Time Trial to become double World Champions.
The pair are current World Tandem B Time Trial champions, after winning the title in 2021 at the UCI Paracycling World Championships in Cascais, Portugal.

Cycling career
Bate was introduced to the ideas of para-cycling by friend and Great Britain team member Karen Darke; both of whom have conquered El Capitan in Yosemite National Park. Bate has climbed the rock face 3 times including a solo ascent of Zodiac, becoming the first visually impaired person to achieve this. In 2013 he was accepted onto British Cycling’s Paralympic Development Programme and, was teamed up with sight piloted Adam Duggleby. In December 2014, after became the British road and time trial national champion, Bate was advanced from the development programme to the Paralympic Podium Programme, for athletes who British Cycling believe have medal potential at Paralympic level. The next year he made his World Championship debut, competing at the 2015 Championships in Apeldoorn.

In 2015 Bate and Duggleby won their first World Cup medals together. At Maniago in Italy they took silver in the road race and a bronze in the time trial; and followed this with a gold medal in the time trial at the Pietermaritzburg World Cup in South Africa. In July 2016, Bate was named in the Great Britain team to compete at the 2016 Summer Paralympics in Rio.

Bate was appointed Member of the Order of the British Empire (MBE) in the 2017 New Year Honours for services to cycling.

At the 2020 Tokyo Paralympics, Duggleby and Bate won silver in the men's individual pursuit B.

Personal history
Bate was born (in 1977) and brought up in New Zealand and attended Mount Albert Grammar School, from 1991-1994, before moving to Moray in Scotland in adulthood. He has Retinitis Pigmentosa which has left him with a 10% field of vision.

References

1977 births
Living people
Scottish male cyclists
Scottish track cyclists
New Zealand male cyclists
Cyclists at the 2016 Summer Paralympics
Cyclists at the 2020 Summer Paralympics
Medalists at the 2016 Summer Paralympics
Medalists at the 2020 Summer Paralympics
Paralympic gold medalists for Great Britain
Paralympic silver medalists for Great Britain
Paralympic bronze medalists for Great Britain
Members of the Order of the British Empire
Sportspeople from Moray
New Zealand emigrants to the United Kingdom
Paralympic medalists in cycling
Paralympic cyclists of Great Britain